Vali the storm is a popular manele singer in Romania, of Romani ethnicity.
His real name is  Valentin Rusu. He has released several hits on his own (like "Vino In Braţele Mele" or "Glumeşte In Iubire") as well as with other artists like Adrian Minune, Adi de la Vâlcea ("Mi-ai Zapacit Înima", "Aseara Te Am Sunat") and Costi Ioniţă ("Ninge Iar").

References 

Living people
Romanian manele singers
Romanian Romani people
Place of birth missing (living people)
Year of birth missing (living people)